The Cryptopidae are a family of scolopendromorph centipedes. Cryptopids are blind (lacking ocelli) and possess 21 pairs of legs. The genus Cryptops is the numerically largest in the family, comprising over 150 species worldwide.

Classification 
The following genera, may be included: 
 Cryptops Leach, 1814
 Eremops Bollman, 1893
 Mimops Kraepelin, 1903
 Paracryptops Pocock, 1891
 Tonkinodentus Schileyko, 1992
 Trigonocryptops Verhoeff, 1906

The genera Plutonium and Theatops Newport, 1844, formerly classified in the cryptopid subfamily Plutoniuminae, are now placed in the recently elevated family Plutoniumidae.

References 

Centipede families
Cryptopidae